This is the discography for French electronic musician Sébastien Akchoté.

Studio albums

Compilations

Extended plays and singles

Singles

Soundtracks

Other tracks

Production credits

Albums

Tracks

Remixes 

Unreleased remixes
2008: The Who - "Baba O' Riley"
2009: Amon Düül II - "Spaniards & Spacemen"
2010: Depeche Mode - "Master and Servant"
2016: Earth, Wind & Fire - "Shining Star"

References 

Discographies of French artists
Electronic music discographies